The general trend of Scandinavian nobility seems to be that there were comparatively few large magnates and generally most had connections to the royalty. The sources on nobility in 13th century Scandinavia are, at least in the English language, few and far between when compared to other regions but there is still enough to get a good idea of the general composition. It also appears that lords had less control over the peasantry in many cases. This is probably partially due to the large nature of the countries which gave ample land for semi-independent farmers.

Kings

Kings of Denmark

Kings of Norway

Kings of Sweden 

|bgcolor=pink rowspan="2"|Sverker II the Younger (Sverker den yngre), 1196 – 31 January 1208||rowspan="2"|||rowspan="2"|born before 1167, probably already  1164 son of king Charles VII and queen Christine Stigsdatter of Hvide||(1) BenedictaHouse of Hvide||rowspan="2"|Died in the Battle of Gestilren, 17 July 1210, aged about 45, buried at Alvastra Abbey
|-
|bgcolor=tan|(2) IngegerdHouse of Bjelbo
|-
|bgcolor=yellow|Eric (X) (Erik Knutsson),  31 January 1208 – 10 April 1216||||1180 son of Canute I Ericson||bgcolor=#ccddff|Richeza of Denmark (the daughter of Valdemar I of Denmark)||Died suddenly in fever on Näs Castle, Visingsö, 10 April 1216, aged about 36, buried at Varnhem Abbey
|-
|bgcolor=pink|John I the Child (Johan Sverkersson unge), Spring 1216 – 10 March 1222||||1201 son of Sverker II||None ||Died on Visingsö, 10 March 1222, aged about 21, buried at Alvastra Abbey
|-
|bgcolor=yellow|Eric (XI) the Lisp and Lame (Erik läspe och halte),  Summer 1222–28 or 29 November 1229||||1216 son of king Erik X of Sweden and Richeza of Denmark||bgcolor=tan|Catherine of Ymseborg||2 February 1250, aged about 34, buried at Varnhem Abbey
|-
|bgcolor=yellow|Canute II the Tall (Knut Långe)  28 or 29 November 1229 – 1234||||son of Holmger who was "nepos" (nephew?) of Canute I Ericson||HelenHouse of Strange||1234, buried at Sko kloster
|-
|bgcolor=yellow|Eric (XI) the Lisp and Lame (Erik läspe och halte),  1234 – 2 February 1250||||1216 son of king Erik X of Sweden and Richeza of Denmark||bgcolor=tan|Catherine of Ymseborg||2 February 1250, aged about 34, buried at Varnhem Abbey
|-
|bgcolor=tan|Valdemar (Valdemar Birgersson)  Spring 1250 – 22 July 1275||||1239 son of Birger jarl and Ingeborg Eriksdotter (a daughter of Eric X)||bgcolor=#ccddff|Sophia of Denmarkdaughter of King Eric IV||Died while imprisoned by his brother Magnus at Nyköping Castle, 26 December 1302, aged about 63, buried at Vreta Abbey or Riddarholmen Church
|-
|bgcolor=tan|Magnus III (Magnus Ladulås)  22 July 1275 – 18 December 1290||||1240 son of Birger jarl and Princess Ingeborg Eriksdotter (a daughter of Eric X)||Helwig of HolsteinHouse of Schauenburg||Visingsö, 18 December 1290, aged about 50, buried in Riddarholmen Church
|-
|bgcolor=tan|Birger (Birger Magnusson)  18 December 1290 – March/April 1318|| || 1280 son of Magnus III and Helwig of Holstein||bgcolor=#ccddff|1298 Martha of Denmark||31 May 1321, in exile in Denmark, after murdering his brothers at Nyköping Banquet, aged about 41, buried at Ringsted, Zealand
|-
|}

Great Lords 
For this list since there are not enough great lords to warrant an alphabetical list the lords will be listed by precedence. Many of the larger lordships were held as appanage for various royal family members or were held by bishops. For some of the bishoprics, some bishops who had terms under 4 years may not be listed to avoid clutter.

Under the Kings of Denmark

Under the Kings of Norway

Under the Kings of Sweden

Noblemen, Kingsmen, Lendmen, and Knights

Under the Kings of Denmark
Ditlev Reventlow (~1210~1260) (Bailiff of Ditmarsken)

Johann von Haxthausen (~1245–1300) (Borgmester of Paderborn)

Stig Anderson (1230–1293)

Jens Kalf (~1230–1304)

Havtor Jonsson (~1255–1320)

Elv Erlingsson (~1240–1290)

Tyge Abildgaard (~1200–1260)

Laurid's Abildgaard (~1240–1280)

Aluericus de Bernekowe (~1190–1240)

Detlev Brockdorff (~1200–1250)

Sifridus de Bokwolde (~1200–1250)

Niels Hak (~1225~1282)

Thorsten Hak (~1220~1282)

Niels Juul (~1255–1300)

Oluf Lunge (~1245–1302)

Gerhardus de Oldenburg (~1230~1280)

Conradus de Oldenburg (~1230~1280)

Theodoricus de Quale (~1200~1250)

Johann Ranzow  (~1200~1250)

Heinrich de Wedele (~1185–1240)

Hasso de Wedele (~1185–1240)

Reimbem de Wedele (~1185–1240)

Adam von Winterfeld (~1250–1300)

Heinrich von Bardenflete (~1190–1240)

Niels Brock (~1270–1330)

Rane Jonsen (1254–1294)

Borchadus Dus (~1230–1280)

Hartwicus Dus (~1230–1280)

Heinrich von Lu (~1200–1260)

Niels I Uffesen Neb (~1240–1300)

Johann Ranzow (~1200–1250)

Wernerus de Sculenburch (~1215–1265)

Ago Wind (~1170–1220)

Tue the Tall – Late 12th century (Important Knight of Bishop Absalon who fought the wends)

Esbern – Late 12th century (From Zealand, Important Knight of Bishop Absalon who fought the wends)

Then Niels – Late 12th century (Skilled knight from Zealand)

Thorbjorn – Late 12th century (A good knight mentioned in Gesta Danorum volume II)

Herbord – Late 12th century

Eskil – Late 12th century

Peder Thorsentenson – Knight, brother in law to Absalon, possibly still living at the beginning of the 13th century

Mogens Trefeld (b. ~1260) - Knight named after coat of arms

Josef Magnussen Drefeld (d. 1301) - Knight, son of Mogens Trefeld, man of Eric VI of Denmark, murdered in Lund

Under the Kings of Norway
Jon Smør (~1260–1328)

Sigurd Ribbung

Martin Konungsfrænd (c. 1180–1245) – Councillor, Liegeman, Royalty

Simon Kine (c. 1190–1245) – Liegeman

John Steel (Liegeman) (c. 1170–1230) – Liegeman

Brynjolf Steel (~1205–1270) – Liegeman, son of John Steel

Ivar Nosy (~1190–1250) – Liegeman

Andrew Shieldband – Kinsman and Special friend of King Haakon IV of Norway

Ogmund Crouchdance

Munan Byskopson (~1200–1260)

Sigurdr Byskupsson – Brother of Munan

Jakob Bille

Thorkel Bille

Elv Haraldsson Bolt

Ivar in Skedjuhov

Jon Ivarsson

Havtore Jonsson

Skules Bardssons men:

Alf of Leifa-steads (~1200–1240)

Endrid Bookling (~1180–1240)

Norwegian Rebels:

Gudolf of Blakkasteads – Guardian of Sigurd Ribbung during his minority and leader of the Ribalds in 1217

Under the Kings of Sweden

Håkan Jonsson Läma (~1270–1318) (Marshal of Sweden: 1310–1318)

Tyrgils Knutsson (~1260–1306), (Knight: 1289–1306) (Regent of Sweden: 1290–1298)

Knut Matsson (~1250–1289), (Steward, Councillor: 1280–1289)

Filip Törnesson (Lawman: 1272–1279)

Ulf Karlsson (1247–1276), (Councillor: 1276–1280)

Folke Karlsson (1262–1286), (Knight: 1273–1280)

Magnus Ragvaldsson (~1250–1288)

Karl Gustafsson (marsk) (d. after 1280)

Håkan Ingeborgasson (d. after 1320)

Magnus Ragvaldsson - drots 1288

Birger Filipsson (Aspenäsätten) - (d. 1280) executed for participating in the Folkunga Uprising 

Johan Filipsson (Aspenäsätten) - (d. 1280) executed for participating in the Folkunga Uprising 

Orestes Keldorsson (d. after 1305) - castle bailiff of Stockholm 1289 

Werner Brunkow (living 1286-1290) - Mecklenburg immigrant in service of the king of Sweden 

Henrik Glysing (d. after 1324) - Nobleman from Holstein in the service of the king of Sweden 

Tomas Jonsson Grip (mentioned 1296-1299) - Ancestor of Bo Jonsson (Grip)

Leonard Ödesson (Örnfot) (d. after 1310)

Ragvald Puke (Mentioned 1296-1308)

Ragne Stallare (Stablemaster in 1274)

Nils Sestridasson (mentioned 1287-1301)

Hemming Ödgislason (knight in 1303)

Birger Likvidsson (bought land in 1303) 

Abjörn Sixtensson  (~1275–1310)

Johan Karlsson (~1250–1280)

Rorik Algotsson  (~1260–1300)

Algot Brynolfsson (1228–1299)

Magnus Algotssson (~1270–1309)

Johan Krummedige

Sounds Krummedige

Iven Krummedige

Nicolaus de Ottenbüttel Krummedige

Eler de Ottenbüttel Krummedige

Volbrecht de Ottenbüttel Krummedige

Nils in Långserum

References

13th-century Norwegian nobility
13th-century Danish nobility
13th-century Swedish nobility